Valér Barač (16 July 1909 – 11 August 1991) was a Slovak athlete. He competed in the men's discus throw at the 1936 Summer Olympics.

References

External links
 

1909 births
1991 deaths
Athletes (track and field) at the 1936 Summer Olympics
Slovak male discus throwers
Olympic athletes of Czechoslovakia
People from Košice-okolie District
Sportspeople from the Košice Region